If I Am President is a 2018 Nigerian political drama film written and directed by Bright Wonder Obasi. It stars Ayoola Ayolola, Joke Silva,<ref>{{Cite web|url=https://www.lindaikejisblog.com/2018/10/joke-silva-and-ayo-ayoola-contest-for-president-in-the-movie-if-i-am-president-in-cinemas-from-november-9-2018.html.html|title = Joke Silva and Ayo Ayoola contest for President in the movie "If I Am President, in Cinemas from November 9, 2018|date = 26 October 2018}}</ref> Rahama Sadau, Bimbo Manuel, Ivie Okujaye, Bryan Okwara, Ayo Emmanuel, Bimbo Manuel, Victor Decker, and Osas Iyamu.

A High Definition Film Studios production as supported by John D. and Catherine T. MacArthur Foundation, If I am President is a movie that brings to light the true political state of affairs of the Nigerian Government. It is centered around the story of 37-year old Zinachi Ohams, the presidential candidate of the Nigerian Rebirth Party, a new party made up of young idealists and recently metamorphosed from a Civil Society Organization.

 Cast 

Ayoola Ayolola as Zinachi Ohams
Joke Silva as Rakia
Bimbo Manuel as Elvis
Bryan Okwara as Timi
Rahama Sadau as Michelle Ohams
Rachel Bakam as Show Host
Ivie Okujaye as Umi
Uzee Usman as Martins
Rekiya Atta as Atinuke Williams
Sydney Diala as Zinachi Oham's Father
Olukayode Aiyegbusi as Senator Dimbo
Osas Iyamu as Bovi
 Norman Doormor as Enenche
Ayo Emmanuel as Man
Ray Adeka as Bankole
Adaora Onyechere as Genevieve (Presidential Debate Host)
Victor Decker as Makata
Chimdiya Nwigwe as Muna Ohams

 Production 
If I Am President is a production of High Definition Film Studios with Bright Wonder Obasi, Osaretin Iyamu, and Nnadi Dumkennenna serving as producers. Written by Bright Wonder Obasi, the film explores the themes of Nigerian political system with the struggle in political parties and for power.

 Release If I am President'' was scheduled for a World Premiere on Saturday, October 20, 2018, at the Transcorp Hilton Hotel in Abuja.  It was released across cinemas in Nigeria on October 20, 2018.

Awards & Nominations 
The movie won an award for Best Screenplay at the 2019 Motion Pictures International Film Festival, Oklahoma City, Oklahoma
United States.

External links

References 

Nigerian comedy-drama films
2018 comedy-drama films
2010s political drama films
2018 films
2010s English-language films
English-language Nigerian films
Films set in Nigeria